Ricardo Francisco García Cervantes (born 4 October 1954) is a Mexican politician affiliated with the PAN. As of 2013 he served as Senator of the LX and LXI Legislatures of the Mexican Congress representing Coahuila. He also served as Deputy during the LVIII Legislature and also as President of the Chamber of Deputies between 1 September 2000 and 31 August 2001.

He was appointed to Ambassador of Mexico to Costa Rica between 2002 and 2004.

References

1954 births
Living people
Politicians from Torreón
Members of the Senate of the Republic (Mexico)
Members of the Chamber of Deputies (Mexico)
Presidents of the Chamber of Deputies (Mexico)
Ambassadors of Mexico to Costa Rica
National Action Party (Mexico) politicians
21st-century Mexican politicians